Valérie Marie Christelle Gauvin (born 1 June 1996) is a French professional footballer who plays as a forward for FC Fleury 91 and the France national team.

Club career

Toulouse
Gauvin was born on the French island of Réunion and moved to the south-west of mainland France with her mother and sister at the age of 4. At the age of 12 she joined Toulouse to train with the club, and at the age of 16 joined the senior team in the Division 2 Féminine. In 2012–13, Gauvin played for Toulouse in the Division 1 Féminine before being relegated back to the Division 2 Féminine. In the 2013–14 season she was the top scorer of the league with 32 goals in 20 games. During her time at Toulouse, she also scored 45 goals in the National U19 Challenge.

Montpellier
In June 2014, Gauvin returned to the Division 1 Féminine, joining Montpellier. In May 2017, following a successful season in which she scored 13 goals in 17 appearances and helped Montpellier qualify for the 2017–18 UEFA Women's Champions League, Gauvin signed a contract extension until 2020.

Everton
After scoring 14 goals in 16 appearances for Montpellier in the 2019–20 season, Gauvin was signed by FA Women's Super League club Everton in August 2020.

North Carolina Courage
On 31 March 2022, the North Carolina Courage of the American National Women's Soccer League paid a transfer fee to Everton to acquire Gauvin, who signed a one-year contract with one-year option. After five months without an appearance for the club while recuperating from minor injuries, the Courage traded Gauvin to Houston Dash in exchange for $25,000 in allocation money and a conditional second-round pick in the 2024 NWSL Draft.

International career
In July 2012, Gauvin represented France under-16 at the 2012 Nordic Under-16 Cup. She started in the 1–0 loss to Sweden, started and scored the first goal in the 5–1 victory over Finland, and started and scored a brace in the 3–0 victory over Norway, giving France the third place in the tournament.

In October 2012, Gauvin represented France under-17 in the first round of the 2013 UEFA Women's Under-17 Championship qualification campaign. She started all 3 matches, scoring a brace in the 5–0 victory against Bosnia and Herzegovina, a brace in the 12–0 victory over Lithuania, and a hat-trick in the 5–0 victory over Hungary. In March 2013, she was in the French squad for the second round. She started and scored a goal in both the 3–1 victory over Northern Ireland and in the 2–0 victory over Finland, but came on as a 75th minute substitute in the 1–1 draw with Spain, who qualified due to a better goal-difference.

In July 2015, Gauvin helped France to win the gold medal at the 2015 Summer Universiade, including opening the scoring against Russia in the 2–0 victory in the final.

In September 2015, Gauvin was called up to the French senior team for the first time, for matches against Brazil and Romania. She made her official debut appearance for the French senior team on 23 October 2015, in a 2–1 loss to the Netherlands, coming on as a substitute for Marie-Laure Delie in the 71st minute.

In November 2016, Gauvin was selected for France's under-20 squad for the 2016 FIFA U-20 Women's World Cup. She played in a friendly against Canada in Australia ahead of the tournament, scoring the second goal in a 2–0 victory. In the tournament's group stage she came on as a late sub in the 0–0 draw against the United States and in the 2–0 victory over New Zealand. She started in the 2–2 draw against Ghana, providing the assist for the first goal by Delphine Cascarino. In the knock-out stage she came on as a sub in extra-time in the semi-final 2–1 victory over Japan and in the 73rd minute in the final against North Korea which France lost 3–1.

In March 2017, Gauvin represented the French secondary senior team at the 2017 Istria Cup. She played in all 4 matches, scoring a hat-trick against Hungary B. France B finished the tournament in third place, beating Northern Ireland 1–0.

On 23 October 2017, Gauvin scored her first goal for the French senior team in an 8–0 victory over Ghana during a friendly match. On 6 April 2018, Gauvin scored a hat-trick in an 8–0 victory over Nigeria.

Career statistics

International

Scores and results list France's goal tally first, score column indicates score after each Gauvin goal.

References

External links
 
 
 Valérie Gauvin at Montpellier 
 Valérie Gauvin at Footofeminin.fr 
 
 

1996 births
Living people
French women's footballers
Women's footballers from Réunion
Sportspeople from Saint-Denis, Réunion
Women's association football forwards
France women's youth international footballers
France women's international footballers
2019 FIFA Women's World Cup players
Division 1 Féminine players
Toulouse FC (women) players
Montpellier HSC (women) players
Universiade gold medalists for France
Universiade medalists in football
Medalists at the 2015 Summer Universiade
Black French sportspeople
French expatriate sportspeople in England
Expatriate women's footballers in England
French expatriate sportspeople in the United States
Expatriate women's soccer players in the United States
National Women's Soccer League players
North Carolina Courage players
Houston Dash players
French expatriate women's footballers